John Wilson Fairweather (12 August 1924 – December 1989) was a Scottish footballer who played as a right-half.

Fairweather, known as Jock, played for Queen of the South and Annan Athletic before joining English club Blackburn Rovers in April 1944. He moved to Cowdenbeath in 1947 and made 10 appearances. He then returned to England in November 1948 to join Carlisle United, where he made a single Football League appearance.

He was enlisted by Bath City for the 1950–51 season, joining fellow new recruits Trevor Jones, Tommy Edwards, and George Adams, and spent three seasons with the club.

Fairweather went on to manage Frome Town and led the club to an FA Cup first-round game against Leyton Orient in 1954. He returned to Bath City as reserve team coach in July 1956.

References

1924 births
1989 deaths
Scottish footballers
Scottish football managers
People from Sutherland
Annan Athletic F.C. players
Association football wing halves
Bath City F.C. players
Blackburn Rovers F.C. players
Carlisle United F.C. players
Cowdenbeath F.C. players
English Football League players
Frome Town F.C. managers
Queen of the South F.C. players